Guo Shuyan (October 1935 – 23 January 2022) was a Chinese engineer and politician. He served as Governor of Hubei Province from 1990 to 1993. He also served as the deputy director of the State Science and Technology Commission from 1985 to 1990 and deputy director of the Three Gorges Project Construction Committee from 1993 to 2003.

Early life and education 
Guo Shuyan was born in October 1935 in Zhenping County, Henan, Republic of China. He attended Nankai University in 1952, before going to the Soviet Union to study at the Ural Polytechnic Institute, where he earned a degree in metallurgy in 1959. He joined the Communist Party of China in 1957.

Career 
In 1959, in the midst of the Great Leap Forward, Guo returned to China and worked at the Shenyang Manufacturing Research Institute of the First Ministry of Machine Building. He would work at the institute for nearly two decades, later rising to deputy director.

From 1978 to 1982, Guo served as deputy director and Chief Engineer of the Institute of High Energy Physics of the Chinese Academy of Sciences. He served as deputy director of the Bureau of Development Estimates of the State Science and Technology Commission from 1982 to 1983, and deputy director of the Science and Technology Leading Group of the State Council from 1983 to 1984.

From 1985 to 1990, Guo served as deputy director of the State Science and Technology Commission. In this capacity, he was instrumental in introducing the Chinese-developed anti-malarial drug artemisinin to Africa.

In 1990, Guo was appointed Governor and Deputy Party Secretary of Hubei Province. His predecessor, Guo Zhenqian (no relation), had disagreed with Guan Guangfu, the Party Secretary of Hubei, over the ambitious "Rising Abruptly" strategy, which aimed to dramatically increase the province's economic output. However, Guo Shuyan also proved incompatible with Guan, and similarly ended his term prematurely.

From 1993 to 2003, Guo Shuyan served as deputy director of the Three Gorges Project Construction Committee. He also concurrently served as deputy director of the State Planning Commission from 1993 to 1998. From 2003 to 2008, he served as Vice Chairman of the Financial and Economic Affairs Committee of the 10th National People's Congress.

References 

1935 births
2022 deaths
Governors of Hubei
People's Republic of China politicians from Henan
Politicians from Nanyang, Henan
Engineers from Henan
Chinese metallurgists
Nankai University alumni
Chinese expatriates in the Soviet Union
Delegates to the 10th National People's Congress